West Coast Division is an administrative division of Sabah, Malaysia. It occupies the northwest portion of Sabah. With an area of 7,588 square kilometres, it occupies 10.3% of Sabah's territory. It also has approximately 30% of Sabah's total population, with the main indigenous inhabitants comprising the Bajau, Bisaya, Bruneian Malay, Dusun, Illanun, Kadazan and Kedayan, as well with a significant numbers of Chinese. The division is divided into the districts of Ranau, Kota Belud, Tuaran, Penampang, Papar, and the state capital Kota Kinabalu. The main towns are as in the names of the districts, plus other towns including Putatan, Inanam, Telipok, Tamparuli, Tenghilan and Kinarut.

Kota Kinabalu Harbour is the main sea ports in the state's capital with an estimate size of 1,440 kilometres long coast. It serves as the gateway for water transport in Sabah. It handles and handles 4,031,000 freight tonne annually. The Kota Kinabalu International Airport serves as the main gateway into the state by air.

Districts 
West Coast Division is subdivided into the following administrative districts:
 Kota Belud District (1,386 km2) (Kota Belud Town)
 Kota Kinabalu District (350 km2) (Kota Kinabalu City)
 Papar District (1,234 km2) (Papar Town)
 Penampang District (466 km2) (Penampang Town)
 Putatan District (29,7 km2) (Putatan Town) – recently established in 2007
 Ranau District (2,978 km2) (Ranau Town)
 Tuaran District (1,165 km2) (Tuaran Town)

Member of Parliament (Dewan Rakyat)

History 
The present divisions of Sabah is largely inherited from the division of the North Borneo Chartered Company. Following the acquisition of North Borneo under the royal charter issued in 1881, the administrative division introduced by Baron von Overbeck was continued by the establishment of two residences comprising West Coast Residency and East Coast Residency. Seat of the two residents was in Sandakan, where the governor was based. Each resident, in turn, was divided into several provinces managed by a district officer.

As North Borneo progresses, the number of residencies has increased to five including: Tawau Residency (also known as East Coast Residency), Sandakan Residency, West Coast Residency, Kudat Residency, and Interior Residency; the provinces were initially named after the members of the board: Alcock, Cunlife, Dewhurst, Keppel, Dent, Martin, Elphinstone, Myburgh and Mayne. The senior residents occupied Sandakan and the West Coast, while the other three resident with the second class residencies occupied Interior, East Coast and Kudat. The residents of Sandakan and West Coast were members of the Legislative Council, the Legislative Assembly of the company.

The division into residencies was maintained when North Borneo became a Crown Colony after World War II. On 16 September 1963, with the formation of Malaysia, North Borneo which subsequently became the state of Sabah took over the administrative structure through the Ordinance on Administrative Units. At the same time, the Yang di-Pertua Negeri, the head of state of Sabah, was authorised by proclamation to divide the state into divisions and districts. The abolition of the residency term was in favour of the division term that took place in 1976.

Today, the division has only formal significance and no longer constitutes its own administrative level. The resident's post was also abolished, as Sabah's municipal administration is in the hands of the district officers.

See also 
 Divisions of Malaysia

Notes

Literature

References

Further reading 
 State of Sabah: Administrative Divisions Ordinance – Sabah Cap. 167 (PDF) of 1 November 1954; last amended on 16 September 1963, as amended in August 2010; Accessed on 3 November 2017